Dire Dawa University is a public university located in  Dire Dawa, Ethiopia. It opened for the 2006–07 academic year with 754 students, as one of 13 new universities started by the Ministry of Higher Education, Federal Democratic Republic of Ethiopia.

History 
Dire Dawa University was established in 2006 with enrollment of 754 students in three facilities: (Faculty of Natural Science and Mathematics, Faculty of Social Science and language and Faculty of Business and Economics) in 13 different undergraduate academic programs with 90 teachers and 103 administrative support staff operating with limited facilities. In 2008, an affiliate campus of Haramaya University was merged to Dire Dawa University to construct more buildings and workshops.

In 2018, DDU established one Institute of Technology and Five College(College of Natural & Computational Science, College of Business & Economics, College of Social Sciences & Humanities, College of Law and College of Medicine and Health Science) containing 33 different academic programs. An enrollment has been increased to 12,500 in 39 academic programs; 7,971 of whom learned evening, weekend and summer in different programs.
Dire Dawa Institute of Technology is one of ten institutes in Ethiopia responsible for industry-led economic transition. Prioritizing science and technology, DDU implemented national policy of 70:30 (Engineering & Natural Science to Social Sciences). As of 2018, the university had 1,177 academic staffs; 834 were on duty whereas 343 were in full study to leave second and third degree.

The academic staffs consisted of 28 % of first-degree holders, and 72% of second-degree and above holders. DDU also has 1,143 permanent academic staffs, whereas 28% contract based  staffs and 58% technical staffs during 2007–2018 academic year.

Faculties and colleges 
 School of Law
 School of Medicine
 College of Business & Economics
 College of Social Sciences & Humanities
 College of Natural & Computational Sciences
 Institute of Technology

Administration 
Dire-Dawa University is governed by a University Board of Directors, with day-to-day management provided by a President and several Vice Presidents.

, the leadership team of Dire Dawa University comprises:

 Ubah Adem, Ph.D., President, Dire-Dawa University  
 Megersa Kasim, Ph.D., Academic Affairs V/President
 Temam Awol, Ph.D., Business Process and Development V/President 
 Solomon Zerihun, Ph.D., Research and Community Engagement V/President
 Abreham Ewnetu, Ph.D., Administration and Student Affairs V/President
 Tewodros Gedefaye, A/Scientific Director

References

External links
 

Education in Ethiopia
Dire Dawa
Educational institutions established in 2006
2006 establishments in Ethiopia
Universities and colleges in Ethiopia
21st-century architecture in Ethiopia